Public Security ( [VB],  [VB]) was the regular police force of the Czechoslovak Socialist Republic (ČSSR), created in 1945 as a branch of the National Security Corps, which also included State Security, Armed Airport Security) and Armed Railway Security,.

History
When the Czech Police was established on July 15, 1991, the VB was used as the basis of reforming the force under Act 283/1991 Coll.

Organization
The VB was divided into the Public Order and Traffic VB (Highway Patrol), Criminal Investigations VB (major crimes, forensics) and an Infrastructure Security section (security of important buildings, installations, etc.). There were regional, district, city and local detachments of the force. Its given wartime mission scenarios incklude rear security operations and security of POW facilities.

The VB were permitted to demand from any citizen an identification booklet. This booklet contained a photograph and information such as name, current address and place of employment (being unemployed in the ČSSR was practically illegal, as one could be charged with "living on avails of the society"). As carrying an občanský průkaz was mandatory; a person could be detained for simply not having one in their possession.

The auxiliary wing was the 'Public Security Auxiliary Guard', recruited from "politically reliable" citizens over the age of 21, who wore a red arm-band with "PS VB". They were generally used for traffic control and public order duties.

Vehicles
VB vehicles were originally blue with a white line along the side. Later vehicles had panels painted orange and white in a similar pattern to American 'black and whites', which the pattern's designer admitted after the fall of the regime was his inspiration. The full name '' was used with the blue design while later vehicles had only the letters 'VB' written on the white doors.

Uniforms
VB uniforms were also originally dark blue until the end of 1960s, when they changed to a khaki colour described officially as 'nettle green', with rank insignia on red epaulettes, which did not follow Soviet patterns, except for junior officers.

Rank structure

References

Bibliography

See also
Police of the Czech Republic
Law enforcement in Slovakia

Law enforcement agencies of Czechoslovakia
Law enforcement in Czechoslovakia
Czechoslovak law
1945 establishments in Czechoslovakia